One Big Town is an album by American folk singer/guitarist Greg Brown, released in 1989.

History
It is Brown's first in a long association with Bo Ramsey as producer and instrumentalist. In an interview with Roy Kasten for No Depression magazine, Brown said of Ramsey: “We had met a long time before we played together; we both had bands in town, late ’70s or early ’80s. We talked a little, Bo had some idea that we should do something. He had heard one of my records and said he thought it really needed work... Bo has really taught me to enjoy the studio. Nine-tenths of what we do is live, but it’s a different approach; it’s relaxed and thoughtful. I never really thought of making a record before then.”

Reception

Writing for Allmusic, music critic William Ruhlman wrote of the album "One Big Town is not a subtle album by any means, but it is an impassioned one, even if you worry that its creator might be ready to quit the music business and retire to some remote farm by the end of it."

Track listing
All song by Greg Brown.
 "The Way They Get Themselves Up" – 2:15
 "The Monkey" – 4:26
 "One Cool Remove" – 3:01
 "Back Home Again" – 3:58
 "Just Live" – 3:17
 "One Big Town" – 6:14
 "Lotsa Kindsa Money" – 3:58
 "Things Go On" – 4:40
 "America Will Eat You" – 4:56
 "Tell Me It's Gonna Be Alright" – 3:49

Personnel
Greg Brown – vocals, guitar
Bo Ramsey – guitar, background vocals
Bob Thompson – saxophone
Radoslav Lorković – keyboards, background vocals
Rick Cicalo – bass
Steve Hayes – drums

Production
Produced by Greg Brown and Bo Ramsey
Engineered by Tom Tatman
Mixed by Tom Tucker
Photography by Laurel Cazin

References

Greg Brown (folk musician) albums
1989 albums
Red House Records albums